Indian Institute of Information Technology, Design and Manufacturing, Kancheepuram (IIITDM Kancheepuram, also IIITD&M Kancheepuram) is a public institution established in 2007 by the Ministry of Human Resource Development, Government of India to pursue design and manufacturing oriented engineering education, research and to promote the competitive advantage of Indian products in global markets. It was declared as an Institute of National Importance (INI) by the Ministry of Human Resource Development, Government of India, in July 2011, thus becoming the first IIIT to be accorded this status. Later in 2014, IIIT Bill 2014 was passed by the Parliament on 1 December 2014, thus granting the status of Institutes of National Importance upon the 5 MHRD funded IIITs including IIITDM Kancheepuram. Previously IIITDM Kancheepuram was mentoring IIITDM Kurnool in its new campus at Chennai.

Academics

Academic programmes 

The institute offers Bachelor of Technology (B.Tech) and Dual degrees in several technological fields such as Computer Science, Electronics and Communication Engineering and Mechanical Engineering. Admission to the undergraduate programmes is based on All India Rank (AIR) in Joint Entrance Examination (Main) (JEE-Main). Admission to foreigners is through Direct Admission of Students Abroad (DASA).

The institute also offers M.Des and M.Tech (PG) programs as well as Ph.D programs.

Rankings

IIITDM Kancheepuram has been placed in the band "Excellent" (Rank 11-21) among Institutes of National Importance (INI) in ARIIA 2021.

IIITDM Kancheepuram was ranked in the 182 among engineering colleges in India by National Institutional Ranking Framework in 2020.
IIITDM Kancheepuram was ranked in the 184 among engineering colleges in India by National Institutional Ranking Framework in 2022.

Student life

Cultural festivals

Samgatha 
Samgatha is IIITDM's inter-college cultural festival conducted every year in the month of March. It derives its name from the Sanskrit word "Samgatha"(सऽगथा) which means "Confluence". The fest consists of around 40 events.

Vashisht 
Vashisht is IIITDM's inter-college technical festival conducted every year in the month of October. The fest originally was part of the techno-cultural fest "Samgatha". The first iteration of this fest was conducted in 2019.

Student Bodies

SSG 
SSG (acronym for Social Service Group) is institute sponsored social service group which undertakes numerous social and environmental initiatives. Ranging from eye checkup and blood donation camps to conducting cleanliness drive in zoos and beaches, SSG conducts more than 15 large scale volunteered programs in and around the college campus. It's the largest volunteer organization in the institute.

References

External links
 

Indian Institutes of Information Technology
Design schools in India
Universities and colleges in Chennai
Educational institutions established in 2007
2007 establishments in Tamil Nadu